Golden Records was a Simon & Schuster record label based in New York City. It was conceived and founded in 1948 by the Grammy Award-winning children's music producer, Arthur Shimkin, then a new recruit in the S&S business department.  Shimkin went on to found Sesame Street Records with Children's Television Workshop in 1970. Golden was one of the first children's music labels to combine story with melody.  It featured music to accompany Little Golden Books. However, they were not the first instance of a published series which combined books and records. This distinction goes to Bubble Books, published between 1917 and 1922.

The label is mainly remembered for its children's music releases during the 1950s on a subsidiary label, Little Golden Records, which released singles rather than albums. As originally issued from 1948 to 1962, 78 r.p.m. Little Golden Records were six inches (15 cm) in diameter and made of bright yellow plastic (orange plastic was used for a few titles). Each side played for a maximum of about one minute and forty-five seconds at 78 rpm, a speed phased out for most records during the 1950s but a universal standard speed still included on nearly all record players throughout the 1960s. Early releases had illustrated paper labels; on later releases the label was printed directly onto the plastic. They were sold in colorfully illustrated sleeves that included a printed retail price: 25 cents on early sleeves, 29 cents on later ones and through to the end of the series. Many titles were also issued or re-issued as standard 7-inch 45 r.p.m. records.  7-inch EPs as well as 12-inch LPs were also issued.

The music included classic nursery rhymes, fairy tales, Christmas tunes & other holiday jingles, nature, Bible stories and an extensive collection of educational songs. Golden Records featured children's recordings by Bing Crosby, Rosemary Clooney, Danny Kaye, Kay Lande, Alfred Hitchcock, Johnny Cash, Captain Kangaroo, Art Carney, and many more.

Golden Records also issued educational records, such as A Golden Treasury of Poetry, a collection of classic poems read by Alexander Scourby, with commentary written by Louis Untermeyer.

In 2009, Micro Werks released two CDs of the Best of Golden Records. In 2011, Verse Music Group acquired the Golden Records catalog along with the rights to the Golden Records name and began preparations to reissue the catalog with the first batch of reissues in 2012. In 2015, Verse Music Group was acquired by BMG Rights Management; coincidentally, BMG's parent Bertelsmann owns Random House, the current distributor of Golden Books.

Discography

Little Golden Records

RXXX series

See also
 Cricket Records
 Kid Stuff Records
 Parachute Records
 Peter Pan Records

References

American record labels
Record labels established in 1948